The following highways are numbered 571:

United States

Other places